Groupe Scolaire La Résidence (GSR) is a French international school in Casablanca, Morocco. It serves petite section through terminale, the final year of lycée (senior high school/sixth form college).

It was established in 1982.

References

External links
 Groupe Scolaire La Résidence
 } Groupe Scolaire La Résidence

French international schools in Casablanca
1982 establishments in Morocco
Educational institutions established in 1982
20th-century architecture in Morocco